Sibson railway station served the village of Sibson, in the historic area of Soke of Peterborough, England, from 1870 to 1878 on the Stamford and Essendine Railway.

History
The station was opened on 1 January 1870 by the Stamford and Essendine Railway. It was a temporary terminus while the junction with Wansford was closed. The station closed when the junction reopened on 1 March 1878.

References

Disused railway stations in Cambridgeshire
Transport in Peterborough
Buildings and structures in Peterborough
Railway stations in Great Britain opened in 1870
Railway stations in Great Britain closed in 1878
1870 establishments in England
1878 disestablishments in England